Our Gal Sunday is an American soap opera produced by Frank and Anne Hummert, network broadcast via CBS from March 29, 1937, to January 2, 1959, starring Dorothy Lowell and, after Lowell's 1944 death, Vivian Smolen in the title role.

The origin of this radio series was a 1904 Broadway production, Sunday, which starred Ethel Barrymore. This play was the source of the catchphrase, "That's all there is, there isn't any more."

Characters and story
The Hummerts adapted the Broadway play into a long-running melodramatic radio serial about a Colorado orphan who marries a British aristocrat. It began when two grizzled miners, Jackie and Lively, found a child abandoned and left at the door of their mountain cabin. She was given the name Sunday because that was the day she entered their lives. Later, her last name was given as Smithson. As an adult, she was desired by her childhood friend, Bill Jenkins. She fell under the spell of wealthy Englishman Arthur Brinthrope, who came to check his silver mine. Arthur was shot by Jackie, who wanted to prevent him from running away with Sunday. Arthur's brother, Henry, arrived, eventually marrying Sunday. The couple moved to their Black Swan Hall estate in Virginia, where they lived with their adopted son, Lonnie, and their two natural children, Caroline and Little Davy, who was crippled by a hit-and-run driver.

Dorothy Lowell had the title role from 1937 to 1944. When she died in childbirth at age 28, she was replaced by Vivian Smolen, who portrayed Sunday from 1944 to 1959. Leading reference sources claim that Lowell continued to star in the radio program until 1946, but those books and websites are obviously incorrect since Lowell died in 1944.

The show opened with this question: 

"Red River Valley" was the series' theme music. The announcers were Ed Fleming,  Jim Fleming, John Reed King, Art Millett, Bert Parks, Charles Stark, Warren Sweeney and John A. Wolfe.

See also
List of soap operas

References

Listen to
Our Gal Sunday (September 21, 1939)
Our Gal Sunday

External links
Jerry Haendiges Vintage Radio Logs: Our Gal Sunday
Short story in Radio and Television Mirror (February 1940, page 12) based on Our Gal Sunday
WDRC programming: October 2, 1939 schedule

1937 radio programme debuts
1959 radio programme endings
1930s American radio programs
1940s American radio programs
1950s American radio programs
American radio soap operas
CBS Radio programs